"Too Close" is a song by the British record producer Wilkinson, featuring vocals from Detour City. It was released on 23 February 2014, through RAM Records, as the fifth single from his debut album Lazers Not Included. The song has peaked at number 55 on the UK Singles Chart and number 14 on the UK Dance Chart. The release also included remixes of the track by Catching Flies, Wookie, Frankee and Askery.

Music video
A music video to accompany the release of "Too Close" was first released onto YouTube on 22 January 2014 at a total length of three minutes and thirty-nine seconds.

Track listing

Credits and personnel
 Vocals, writer – Tabitha Benjamin
 Producer, programming – Mark Wilkinson
 Trumpet – Ralph Lamb
 Label – RAM Records, Virgin EMI Records

Charts

Release history

References

Wilkinson (musician) songs
2013 songs
2014 singles
RAM Records singles